Beautiful Life (Chinese:笑着活下去) is a Chinese television series starring Yao Qiangyu and Huang Haibo. Premiering in 2007, the series was created by the team that produced the series  Silent Tears and uses some of the same cast.

Plot
Yian Yang was abandoned by her mother when she was 5; her mother was a widow pregnant with twins, and the rich man she was to marry would have broken off their engagement if he had known. Yang was adopted by a good woman who had a bad son, and a husband with a bad temper.

Growing up, Yang was harassed by her brother, and meets her birth mother, brother, and sister again. Yang faces many difficulties as the truth gradually becomes known to everyone, overcoming her troubles with a smile.

References

External links
笑着活下去

2007 Chinese television series debuts
Mandarin-language television shows
2007 Chinese television series endings
Chinese drama television series